Edward Rutter (3 August 1842 – 4 February 1926) was an English first-class cricketer active 1862–76 who played for Middlesex and Marylebone Cricket Club (MCC). He was born in Hillingdon, Middlesex; died in Halliford, Middlesex.

References

1842 births
1926 deaths
English cricketers
Middlesex cricketers
Marylebone Cricket Club cricketers
Gentlemen of England cricketers
Southgate cricketers
Gentlemen of the South cricketers
Gentlemen of Marylebone Cricket Club cricketers